Vilinjiyambakkam Lake, or Vilinjiyambakkam aeri, is a rain-fed reservoir in Avadi, Chennai, India, that is filled during the monsoon seasons.

The lake is spread over an area of 37 acres. Dry during summers, the lake has been used for dumping sewage and garbage in recent years.

See also

Water management in Chennai

References

Lakes of Chennai
Reservoirs in Tamil Nadu